Ruschia namusmontana is a species of plant in the family Aizoaceae. It is endemic to Namibia.  Its natural habitats are rocky areas and cold desert.

References

Endemic flora of Namibia
Ruschia
Least concern plants
Taxonomy articles created by Polbot